Victor Strand may refer to:
Victor Strand (character), a character on Fear the Walking Dead
Victor B. Strand, business executive of Toms International

See also
Victor Strand Kruger, athlete